The Occitania national football team is the football team of Occitania, which is the name given to areas of southern France, westernmost Italy and a small valley in northern Spain where the Occitan language is spoken. It is controlled by the Associacion Occitania de Fotbol. As Occitania is not a recognised state it is neither a member of FIFA nor UEFA, and the team therefore is not eligible to enter either the World Cup or European Championship. They are members of the New Federations Board, and hosted the inaugural VIVA World Cup in November 2006 where they finished 3rd.

Since the Occitania team was established in 2004 they have played numerous friendly matches against sides such as Chechnya and Monaco as well as competing in 4 VIVA World Cup tournaments. In 2009 they finished 6th after their 5th-place match victory over Gozo was annulled, and a year later they completed their best-ever VIVA World Cup performance when they defeated Two Sicilies 2–0 to take 3rd-place. The Occitans were narrowly knocked out by hosts Iraqi Kurdistan national football team in the group stages of the 2012 VIVA World Cup, before eventually finished 5th.

They also participated in the ConIFA World Football Cup 2014 in Östersund, Sweden where they were unbeaten during the whole competition but losing in quarter finals on penalty against Arameans Suryoye football team. They finished at 7th place after beating Abkhazia national football team who won the ConIFA World Football Cup 2016 in Abkhazia.

Occitania also play in the Europeada, which is organised by the Federal Union of European Nationalities (FUEN). In the Europeada 2008 Occitania reached the quarter finals, being eliminated by eventual tournament winner South Tyrol. The Occitans again reached the quarter-finals in the 2012 tournament and finished in 5th place. They finally reached the final, again against South Tyrol, in the 2016 tournament and lost after extra time, finishing 2nd out of 24 teams.

Tournament records

World Cup record

Europeada record

Results and upcoming fixtures

Current squad
Squad for the 2014 ConIFA World Football Cup:
link here

References

External links
Official Website - includes game summaries and rosters (in Occitan)
Facebook Page
Youtube Channel
ConIFA member
FUEN member
ConIFA presenting Occitania

CONIFA member associations
European N.F.-Board teams
Occitania
Football teams in France
Football in Occitania (administrative region)